Velike Grahovše is a settlement in the Municipality of Laško in eastern Slovenia. It is made up of a number of smaller hamlets: Trate, Leše, Loke, Torog, Suho Dobje, and Velike Grahovše. The area is part of the traditional region of Styria. It is now included with the rest of the municipality in the Savinja Statistical Region.

References

External links
Velike Grahovše on Geopedia

Populated places in the Municipality of Laško